Robbie Nallenweg (born May 30, 1991) is an American football quarterback who is currently a free agent. He played college football at Wingate University. He was signed as an undrafted free agent by the West Texas Wildcatters. During the 2014 season, Nallenweg also played for the Salina Bombers and the Green Bay Blizzard.

References

External links
 Wingate bio
 College Football to Pro

1991 births
American football quarterbacks
Living people
Wingate Bulldogs football players
West Texas Wildcatters players
Salina Bombers players
Green Bay Blizzard players
Iowa Barnstormers players